The 1978 Rio de la Plata Championships, also known as the River Plate Championships, was a women's singles tennis tournament played on outdoor clay courts in Buenos Aires in Argentina. The event was part of the A category of the 1978 Colgate Series. The tournament was held from 30 October through 5 November 1978. Third-seeded Caroline Stoll won the singles title and earned $6,000 first-prize money.

Winners

Singles
 Caroline Stoll defeated  Emilse Raponi 6–3, 6–2
It was Stoll's 1st title of the year and the 1st of her career.

Doubles

 Françoise Dürr /  Valerie Ziegenfuss defeated  Laura DuPont /  Regina Maršíková 1–6, 6–4, 6–3

Prize money

Notes

References

External links
 International Tennis Federation (ITF) tournament event details
  Women's Tennis Association (WTA) tournament finals (1971–2014)

Rio de la Plata Championships
1978 in Argentine tennis